The Triumph Trident 660 is a naked motorcycle by manufacturer Triumph Motorcycles Ltd. Following a four year development programme, the Triumph Trident prototype was revealed at the London Design Museum on 25 August 2020. To disguise the final form, the prototype was painted all white with the exception of the engine. A further, less-disguised and fully running prototype was released to the press a few weeks later, and shows the motorcycle undergoing final testing.

Finally, the production version of the Trident was released to the press and journalists on 30 October 2020.

The Trident is intended to compete in the middleweight sector, and be a rival to the likes of the Yamaha MT-07, Kawasaki Z650, Honda CB650R, and to a lesser extent the Suzuki SV650.

Features 

Unlike the Street Triple S, the engine of which was developed to power the new motorcycle, the Trident has an all-new steel perimeter frame.

The motorcycle features:

 Riding modes (rain/road)
 Switchable traction control
 Non-switchable anti-lock brakes
 Hybrid LCD/TFT instrument pod
 Full LED lighting
 Optional quickshifter and autoblipper
 A2 Licence restrictor kit
LAMS Restricted (39 kW) model for Australia / New Zealand market

An optional Bluetooth connectivity system is available, which allows mobile phone connection, navigation, music control, and GoPro control. This system is driven by the My Triumph app, and available for both Android and Apple iOS.

Engine 

The engine is a development of the 660cc Street Triple S unit with sixty seven new components and the following differences:

 Machining of the crankcases
 Smaller bore and longer stroke
 New crankshaft
 New pistons and rings
 Camshafts
 Gearbox selector drum
 Intake system and air box
 New throttle bodies
 Exhaust system

History 

BSA Rocket 3/Triumph Trident

Trident 750/900

References

External links

 

Trident 660
Standard motorcycles
Motorcycles introduced in 2020